Haydarpaşa High School is an Anatolian High School in Üsküdar district of Istanbul, Turkey established in 1934.

History
The school was founded by Mustafa Kemal Atatürk on 26 September 1934 as a boys' school. It was a boarding and day school. With the beginning of the 1948/49 education term, female students were admitted. The mixed-sex education continued until the 1958/59 term, resumed however in the 1980/81 term. The boarding school was closed down in the 1979/80 term, and the sections occupied by the boarding school were left to Marmara University's Faculty of Medicine. The high school left its historical building forever at the end of the 1983/84 term in July. The high school was hosted by the newly built annex of the Haydarpaşa Industrial Vocational High School until 1990. In February 1989, the school moved to its own building in Altunizade neighborhood of Üsküdar. In the 1998/99 term, Haydarpaşa High School was given the status of Anatolian High School,, which admits students with higher standardized test scores and teaches in foreign language. With the legitimation of June 26, 2016, the Ministry of National Education awarded the status "Project School" to the high school.

Initial building

Haydarpaşa High School housed in a monumental historic building from its establishment in 1934 until July 1984. The building was commissioned by Ottoman Sultan Abdul Hamid II (reigned 1876–1909) for use as the "Imperial Medicine School". It was designed by the French-Ottoman architect Alexander Vallaury (1850–1921) and the Italian architect Raimondo Tommaso D'Aronco (1857–1932). The construction began on February 11, 1895 and was completed in 1900. It was situated in the area between the 1828-built Selimiye Barracks and the Haydarpaşa Military Hospital. The ceremonial opening took place on the birthday of the sultan on 15 Sha'ban AH 1321 (November 6, 1903).

The building, built on an  land, has a rectangular plan. It is a two-story building with a basement. Aisles run on two floors of the building around the courtyard, and classrooms were situated at the outer sections in the south, west and north wings. The walls of the building were covered with granite plates brought from quarries in Hereke and Bilecik. Hydraulic lime, imported from Marseille, France, was used as lime mortar.

After merging of the civilian and military medicine education, the building became Haydarpaşa Faculty of Medicine in 1909. The Faculty of Medicine moved to the European part of Istanbul after the 1933 University Reform. The building was handed over to the Ministry of National Education. It served half a century as Haydarpaşa High School between 1934 and 1984. It became then Marmara University's Faculty of Medicine Haydarpaşa Campus.

Notable alumni
Mehmet Ağar (born 1951), former police chief, politician
Mahir Çayan (1946–1972), Marxist-Leninist revolutionary leader
Deniz Gezmiş (1947–1972), Marxist-Leninist revolutionary leader
Cemal Süreya (1931–1990), poet and writer
Yavuz Çetin (1970–2001), musician, songwriter and singer
Halil Ergün (born 1946), actor
Kadir İnanır (born 1949), actor and director
Erkin Koray (born 1941), guitarist, singer-songwriter
Tuncel Kurtiz (1936–2013), actor
Zeki Ökten (1941–2009), film director
Osman Pepe (born 1954), politician and government minister
Niyazi Sayın (born 1927)i musician
Cengiz Topel (1934–1964), fighter pilot
Cavit Orhan Tütengil, (1921–1979), sociologist and columnist
İsmet Yılmaz (born 1961), politician and government minister

References

External links
İstanbul Üsküdar Haydarpaşa Lisesi official website

High schools in Istanbul
1934 establishments in Turkey
Educational institutions established in 1934
Üsküdar
Boarding schools in Turkey